Antonius "Ton" Maria Richter (November 16, 1919, Blaricum, North Holland – August 10, 2009) was a Dutch field hockey player who competed in the 1948 Summer Olympics. He was born in Blaricum. He was a member of the Dutch field hockey team, which won the bronze medal. He played all seven matches as goalkeeper.

External links
 
Ton Richter's profile at databaseOlympics
Ton Richter's obituary 

1919 births
2009 deaths
People from Blaricum
Dutch male field hockey players
Olympic field hockey players of the Netherlands
Field hockey players at the 1948 Summer Olympics
Olympic bronze medalists for the Netherlands
Olympic medalists in field hockey
Medalists at the 1948 Summer Olympics
Sportspeople from North Holland
20th-century Dutch people